Miss Universe Myanmar 2019 was the seventh Miss Universe Myanmar pageant was held on 31 May 2019 at Novotel Max Hotel, Yangon, Myanmar. Hnin Thway Yu Aung, Miss Universe Myanmar 2018 of Bago crowned Swe Zin Htet of Hpa-An her successor at the end of the event.The winner will represent Myanmar at Miss Universe 2019 in Tyler Perry Studios, Atlanta, Georgia, United States.

Results
Color keys

{| class="wikitable sortable" style="font-size: 95%;"
|-
!width="225"|Final Results||width="300"|Contestant||width="300"|International Placement
|-style="background-color:pink"
|Miss Universe Myanmar 2019
|
  Hpa-an – Swe Zin Htet
| style="text-align:center" |  Unplaced - Miss Universe 2019
|-style="background-color:pink"
|1st Runner-Up 
| 
  Myeik – Hmwe Thet
| style="text-align:center" |  Unplaced - Miss Grand International 2019
|-style="background-color:pink"
|2nd Runner-Up
|
  Mandalay – Htet Thiri Zaw
| style="text-align:center" |  Unplaced - Miss Intercontinental 2019
|-style="background:#FFFACD;"
|3rd Runner-Up
| 
  Minbu – Htun Pearl Yadanar
| style="text-align:center" |  Top 20 - Face of Beauty International 2018
|-style="background:#FFFACD;"
|4th Runner Up|
  Myitkyina – Linn Htet Htet Kyaw
| style="text-align:center" |  Top 13 - World Beauty Queen 2019
|-
|5th Runner Up|
  Pathein – Su Su Sandy
|-
|Top 13| Dawei – Nilar Hpakant – Ah Lum Put (Htu Seng) Mawlamyine - Kyawt Kyawt Khine Muse – Mary Htang Htang Myawaddy – Thae Nandar Su Naypyitaw – Pan Pan Angelic Yangon (West) – No Noe K
|-
|}

 Awards 
 Special awards 

 Best in Talent 

 Best National Costume 

 Pageant 
 Judges 
 U Ye Myat Thu
 Sharr Htut Eaindra – Miss Universe Myanmar 2014
 May Barani Thaw – Miss Universe Myanmar 2015
 Absent
 Maung Myo Min – Director
 Moe Set Wine – Miss Universe Myanmar 2013
 Min That San – Fashion Designer

 Contestants 
Official 26 Finalists of Miss Universe Myanmar 2019:

 Notes 

 Debuts 
 Thaton Yangon (East) Withdrawals 

 Kalay  
 Kyaukse 
 Mohnyin 
 Meikhtila 
 Sittwe Returns 
Last competed in 2017:
 Lashio Monywa Muse Did not compete 
 Bagan - Nang Khaing Zin Win not competing due to her father health.
 Bago - Yamin Myat Chel not competing due to her personal injury.
 Keng Tung - Nang July Htun not competing due to undisclosed reasons.
 Loikaw - Julius Nadi Tun not competing due to her personal injury.
 Pyin Oo Lwin - Kay Thwe not competing due to undisclosed reasons.

 Replacements 
 Dawei - Khin Sabal Moe Hlaing was replaced by Nilar the first runner-up of Miss Universe Dawei 2018 because the original winner, Khin Sabal being unable to attend the pageant.
 Myawaddy - Chit Su Ngal was replaced by Thae Nanda Su the first runner-up of Miss Universe Myawaddy 2018 for undisclosed reasons.
 Taungoo - Khin Yamone Tinn was replaced by Kay Kay Phyo, the first runner-up of Miss Universe Taungoo 2018 due to Khin Yamone, had to withdraw due to a personal injury.
 Yangon (East) - Emerald Nyein was replaced by Kha Kha San, the finalist of Miss Universe Myanmar 2018 because the original winner, Emerald Nyein being unable to attend the pageant.

Designations
 Minbu -  Htun Pearl Yadanar was appointed as Miss Universe Minbu 2018.
 Mogok -  Thet Htar Khin was appointed as Miss Universe Mogok 2018.
 Tachileik''' -  Su Lub Nwe was appointed as Miss Universe Tachileik 2018.

References

External links 
 Miss Universe Myanmar official website

2019 in Myanmar
 
2019 beauty pageants
Beauty pageants in Myanmar